Charlo is a given name, nickname, or surname. Notable people with this name include the following:

Given name or nickname
 (1905-1990), Argentine actor Carlos José Pérez de la Riestra
Charlo Greene (born Charlene Egbe), Nigerian-American businesswoman and former reporter/anchor
Chief Charlo of the Bitterroot Salish

Surname
Jermall Charlo (born 1990), American boxer
Jermell Charlo (born 1990), American boxer
Mo Charlo (born 1983), American basketball player

See also

Charl (name)
Charla (name)
Charlo (disambiguation)
Charlot (name)
Charls
Charly (name)